Elidiano "Eli" Marques Lima (born 14 March 1982, in Ibirité) is a Brazilian football player, who plays as a right and left wingback.

Career
Having played for Social Futebol Clube in Brazil, in 2007 he resided in Bulgaria and joined Bulgarian side Belasitsa Petrich. After making some very good performances, he was transferred to CSKA Sofia. He scored his first goal for the team after a great long-range shot in an away game against OFC Sliven 2000.

On 29 July 2009, Marques left CSKA Sofia and signed a contract with Cherno More Varna. On 25 November, he scored his first goal for the team against Chernomorets Burgas in a match of the Bulgarian Cup.

On 26 June 2012, Marques joined Lokomotiv Plovdiv. On 11 July, he made his competitive debut for Lokomotiv, coming on as a substitute in the 2012 Supercup match against Ludogorets Razgrad. Marques also played in the two legs of second qualifying round in the Europa League against Vitesse Arnhem. On 6 August 2012, his contract was terminated by mutual consent.

A day later, Eli Marques joined Etar 1924.

On 14 September 2016, Eli Marques joined Bansko but was released in December. In January 2017, he returned to Oborishte.

In July 2018, Marques joined Pirin Razlog. On 29 December 2019, Marques revealed that he would return to Belasitsa Petrich, this time as a player-assistant coach. New owners arrived and on 1 May 2020, Marques was released.

References

External links

1982 births
Living people
Brazilian footballers
Brazilian expatriate footballers
Sportspeople from Minas Gerais
Association football midfielders
PFC Belasitsa Petrich players
PFC CSKA Sofia players
PFC Cherno More Varna players
AEL Limassol players
PFC Slavia Sofia players
PFC Svetkavitsa players
PFC Lokomotiv Plovdiv players
FC Etar 1924 Veliko Tarnovo players
FC Montana players
PFC Pirin Gotse Delchev players
FC Oborishte players
FC Bansko players
FC Pirin Razlog players
Cypriot First Division players
First Professional Football League (Bulgaria) players
Second Professional Football League (Bulgaria) players
Expatriate footballers in Bulgaria
Expatriate footballers in Cyprus
Brazilian expatriate sportspeople in Bulgaria
Brazilian expatriate sportspeople in Cyprus